Crescent City is a village in Iroquois and Crescent townships, Iroquois County, Illinois, United States. The population was 615 at the 2010 census.

Geography
Crescent City is located in central Iroquois County at  (40.770448, -87.857823). U.S. Route 24 passes through the center of the village, leading east  to Watseka, the county seat, and west  to Gilman near Interstate 57. Illinois Route 49 crosses US 24 on the western side of Crescent City; it leads north  to US Routes 45 and 52 near L'Erable, and south  to Rankin.

History

Railroad accident
On June 21, 1970, the Toledo, Peoria and Western Railroad Company's Train No. 20 derailed in downtown Crescent City. A propane tank car ruptured, and explosions caused fires that destroyed the city center, which included numerous houses and businesses. There were no deaths, although over 60 firefighters and civilians were injured. The disaster would later be featured on episode #124 of the Discovery Channel show Destroyed in Seconds.

Demographics

As of the census of 2000, there were 631 people, 259 households, and 183 families residing in the village. The racial makeup of the village was 98.42% White, 0.48% Native American, 0.48% from other races, and 0.63% from two or more races. Hispanic or Latino of any race were 1.27% of the population.

There were 259 households, out of which 31.7% had children under the age of 18 living with them, 62.9% were married couples living together, 6.6% had a female householder with no husband present, and 29.3% were non-families. 24.7% of all households were made up of individuals, and 15.4% had someone living alone who was 65 years of age or older.  The average household size was 2.44 and the average family size was 2.93.

In the village, the population was spread out, with 25.4% under the age of 18, 5.4% from 18 to 24, 27.3% from 25 to 44, 21.6% from 45 to 64, and 20.4% who were 65 years of age or older.  The median age was 38 years. For every 100 females, there were 97.8 males.  For every 100 females age 18 and over, there were 88.4 males.

The median income for a household in the village was $38,500, and the median income for a family was $46,979. Males had a median income of $32,750 versus $23,594 for females. The per capita income for the village was $17,308.

Gallery

References

Villages in Iroquois County, Illinois
Villages in Illinois